Heilbronn is an electoral constituency (German: Wahlkreis) represented in the Bundestag. It elects one member via first-past-the-post voting. Under the current constituency numbering system, it is designated as constituency 267. It is located in northern Baden-Württemberg, comprising the city of Heilbronn and the northern part of the Landkreis Heilbronn district.

Heilbronn was created for the inaugural 1949 federal election. Since 2017, it has been represented by Alexander Throm of the Christian Democratic Union (CDU).

Geography
Heilbronn is located in northern Baden-Württemberg. As of the 2021 federal election, it comprises the independent city of Heilbronn and the municipalities of Bad Friedrichshall, Bad Rappenau, Bad Wimpfen, Eberstadt, Ellhofen, Eppingen, Erlenbach, Gemmingen, Gundelsheim, Hardthausen am Kocher, Ittlingen, Jagsthausen, Kirchardt, Langenbrettach, Lehrensteinsfeld, Löwenstein, Massenbachhausen, Möckmühl, Neckarsulm, Neudenau, Neuenstadt am Kocher, Obersulm, Oedheim, Offenau, Roigheim, Schwaigern, Siegelsbach, Untereisesheim, Weinsberg, Widdern, and Wüstenrot from the Landkreis Heilbronn district.

History
Heilbronn was created in 1949. In the 1949 election, it was Württemberg-Baden Landesbezirk Württemberg constituency 4 in the numbering system. In the 1953 through 1961 elections, it was number 166. In the 1965 through 1976 elections, it was number 168. In the 1980 through 1998 elections, it was number 171. In the 2002 and 2005 elections, it was number 268. Since the 2009 election, it has been number 267.

Originally, the constituency comprised the independent city of Heilbronn and the district of Landkreis Heilbronn. In the 1976 election, it comprised the city of Heilbronn and the southern part of the Landkreis Heilbronn district. It acquired its current borders in the 1980 election.

Members
The constituency was first represented by Georg Kohl of the Free Democratic Party (FDP) from 1949 until his death in 1952. He was succeeded by fellow FDP member Adolf Mauk in a by-election. Mauk was re-elected in 1953 federal election. Karl Simpfendörfer of the Christian Democratic Union (CDU) won the constituency in 1957. Helmut Bazille of the Social Democratic Party (SPD) was elected in 1961 and served until 1969, when he was succeeded by fellow SPD member Erhard Eppler from 1969 to 1976. Egon Susset of the CDU was then representative from 1976 to 1998, followed by Thomas Strobl from 1998 to 2017. Alexander Throm was elected in 2017 and re-elected in 2021.

Election results

2021 election

2017 election

2013 election

2009 election

References

Federal electoral districts in Baden-Württemberg
1949 establishments in West Germany
Constituencies established in 1949
Heilbronn
Heilbronn (district)